Blister bush can refer to

Notobubon galbanum, a shrub endemic to South Africa
Rhadinothamnus anceps, a shrub endemic to Western Australia